The Lang Wilson Practice in Architecture Culture (LWPAC) is an architectural firm founded in 1999 by Oliver Lang and Cynthia Wilson. It was first launched in New York City before being permanently based in Vancouver, British Columbia, where it evolved into an interdisciplinary business.

History 
The architectural and cultural firm delivers unified resolutions to serve innovative ideas for projects. LWPAC works on projects that are large scale; urban planning, and housing complexes, as well as small scale such as art installations.

LWPAC was co-founded by German-Canadian architect and urban entrepreneur Oliver Lang and Canadian designer and cultural entrepreneur Cindy Wilson. They have worked together in Canada, United States and Germany, to bring-forth a communal and global experience to their projects. LWPAC has developed an intent over the years, to serve as a platform for architecture and urban design. Together, this multidisciplinary collaboration forwards culture as the driving force towards intelligent and innovative designs.

Other projects 
 Museum of Extreme Culture – Whistler, Canada (2002)
 Colegio Chuquicamata Competition – Calama, Chile (2002)
 Dongli Lake Masterplan – Dongli Lake, China (2003)
 Westside Baptist Church – Vancouver, Canada (2004)
 Wallace – Vancouver, Canada (2008)
 Historic Precinct Height Study – Downtown Eastside, Canada (2008)
 SF House – Vancouver, Canada (2009)
 C33 PE House and LWH House – Vancouver, Canada (2010)
 Montessori School – Surrey, Canada (2011)
 NEXT Gallery – Victoria, Canada (Ongoing)

Awards and recognition
 2017 Lafarge Holcim Silver Award – North America – Platforms for Life 
 2016 Major Research Grant – National Research Council Canada
 2016 Urban Design Award City of Vancouver – Vanglo House 
 2016 10 Best Residences Selection – Azure Magazine – UBC Dairy Research Centre Housing
 2014 Urban Design Award City of Vancouver – MONAD – Special Jury Award Excellence and Ingenuity in Architecture 
 2014 Urban Design Award City of Vancouver – MONAD – Medium Scale Residential 
 2013 AIBC Innovation Award – MONAD 
 2013 BC Wood Design Award – MONAD – Canadian Wood Council
 2012 Western Living Designer – Architect of the Year Award
 2010 Major Grant from Canada Council for the Arts
 2008 Governor General's Medal in Architecture – ROAR_One
 2006 Home of the Year Award – ROAR_One – Architecture Magazine New York
 2006 Lieutenant Governor's Medal Architectural Institute of BC Award – ROAR_One
 2006 Lieutenant Governor's Innovation Award – ROAR_One
 2005 ACSA Faculty Design Award
 2005 National Post – Design Exchange Award
 2001 The New Vanguard – Architectural Record
 2000 Bienal Architecture Exhibition – Santiago Chile – School of Architecture – UTFSM

References

External links 
 "Exploring Vancouver" by Harold D Kalman

Companies based in Vancouver
Architecture firms of Canada
Canadian companies established in 1999
Design companies established in 1999
1999 establishments in British Columbia